Crossbones may refer to:
 Crossbones (character), a Marvel Comics supervillain
 CrossBones (film), an American horror film
 Crossbones (TV series), a 2014 American television drama series
 Cross Bones, a disused burial ground in Southwark, London
 Cross Bones (novel), a 2005 novel by Kathy Reichs

See also
 Skull and crossbones (disambiguation)